Mario Antonio Ponce López (born 8 February 1963) is a Salvadoran accountant and politician who served as the president of Legislative Assembly of El Salvador from 2019 to 2021. He was elected as a deputy in the assembly in 2018. 

He is a member of the National Coalition Party of El Salvador.

References

1963 births
Living people
Place of birth missing (living people)
Presidents of the Legislative Assembly of El Salvador 
National Coalition Party (El Salvador) politicians
21st-century Salvadoran politicians
People from La Paz Department (El Salvador)